Jeseri (also known as Dweep Bahsha or Iravaady Bahsha) is a language, spoken in the Union Territory of Lakshadweep in India. The word 'Jeseri' derives from Arabic word Jazari (جزري) which means 'Islander' or 'of island'.
It is spoken on the islands of Chetlat, Bitra, Kiltan, Kadmat, Amini, Kavaratti, Androth, Agatti, and Kalpeni, in the archipelago of Lakshadweep.  Each of these islands has its own dialect. The dialects are similar to Arabi Malayalam, a traditional dialect spoken by the Mappila community of Malabar Coast.

Phonology
The phonology is similar to the Mainland dialect of Malayalam, but with certain notable differences.

The initial short vowels, especially 'u', may fall away.  For example: rangi (Mal. urangi) - slept, lakka (Mal. ulakka) - pestle.

As for the consonants, the following differences are notable:

 Initial ch in Mainland Malayalam, becomes sh: sholli (Mal.(old) cholli) - said.
 Initial p in Mainland Malayalam, becomes f: fenn (Mal. pennu) - girl.
 Initial v in Mainland Malayalam, becomes b: bili (Mal. vili) - call.

Grammar

The grammar shows similarities to Mainland Malayalam.

Nouns

Case endings
The case endings for nouns and pronouns are generally as follows:

 Nominative: nil;
 Accusative: a, na 
 Genitive: aa, naa, thaa;
 Dative: kk, n, oon;
 Communicative: oda, aa kooda, naa kooda;
 Instrumental: aa kond, naa kond;
 Locative: nd, naa ul, l (only in traces);
 Ablative: nd;
 Vocative: e, aa;

Pronouns

 thaan: self;

Verbs 

The conjugations of verbs are similar to Mainland Malayalam.

The verb 'kaanu' - meaning 'see', the same as in Mainland Malayalam, is illustrated here.

There are three simple tenses.

 Present: suffix added is nna (mostly nda); so kaanunna/kaanunda - sees, is seeing.
 Past: the stem of the verb may change as in Mainland Malayalam. For 'kaanu', past is kanda - saw.
 Future: the suffix added is 'um'.  So, kaanum - will see.

The negatives of these tenses show some differences:

 For present tense, the negative is formed by adding vela (ppela for some verbs) to the stem.  Not only that, a present negative may also function as a future negative.  So, kaanuvela - is not seeing, does not see, will not see.
 For past tense, the negative is formed by suffixing ela to the past stem.  So, kandela - did not see, has not seen.  
 For the future tense, the old Malayalam poetic suffix 'aa' may be used (kaanaa).

The interrogative forms are made by suffixing 'aa' with some changes effected.
So, kaanundyaa (does/do ... see?) for kaanunda (sees), kandyaa (did ... see?) for kanda (saw), and kaanumaa/kaanunaa/kaanungaa (will ... see?) for kaanum (will see).

References

Languages of India
Dravidian languages
Lakshadweep
Arabi Malayalam